Afs  is a Syrian village located in Saraqib Nahiyah in Idlib District, Idlib.  According to the Syria Central Bureau of Statistics (CBS), Afs had a population of 6338 in the 2004 census.

Syrian Civil War 

On 27 February 2022, two people were killed and two others were injured after Syrian Arab Army forces bombed the village.

References 

Populated places in Idlib District